Minnesota State Highway 11 (MN 11) is a  highway in northwest and north-central Minnesota, which runs from North Dakota Highway 66 at the North Dakota state line (near Drayton, North Dakota) and continues east to its eastern terminus at the community of Island View on Dove Island, near International Falls.

The route follows the Rainy River between Baudette and International Falls.

Route description
State Highway 11 serves as an east–west route between International Falls, Baudette, Warroad, Roseau, and Drayton, North Dakota.

The western terminus of Highway 11 is at Robbin in Teien Township, at the North Dakota state line, (near Drayton, North Dakota); where Highway 11 becomes North Dakota Highway 66 upon crossing the Red River.

The eastern terminus of the route is at the community of Island View at Rainy Lake, east of International Falls.  The entrance to the Sha Sha Resort is at this point.

The Rainy Lake Visitor Center at Voyageurs National Park is located 12 miles east of International Falls near Highway 11.  The Visitor Center is located immediately south of the junction of Highway 11 and County Road 96.  The visitor entrance is located on County Road 96.

Franz Jevne State Park is located on Highway 11 in Koochiching County on the Rainy River (near Birchdale), between Baudette and International Falls.

Highway 11 between Warroad and Baudette is part of the promoted route MOM's Way.

History
State Highway 11 was authorized in 1920 from Donaldson east to International Falls, then south through the Iron Range to Duluth. U.S. 169 was routed along this highway from 1930 to 1934. In 1934, the north–south portion was redesignated U.S. 53, and Highway 11 was extended on the east to its current terminus east of Island View; and on the west to the Red River, to what is now North Dakota Highway 66.

Sections of the route were still a primitive road in 1929.  The last section of Highway 11 to be paved was between the North Dakota state line and U.S. 75 at Donaldson; this was paved by 1961.

In response to the I-35W Bridge collapse in Minneapolis on August 1, 2007, Governor Tim Pawlenty ordered the inspection of all Minnesota bridges.  During an August 21, 2007 inspection, cracks were found in the Drayton Bridge (Highway 11 / Highway 66), which crosses the Red River between Drayton, North Dakota and Donaldson, Minnesota.  The two cracks found in the structure were believed to be recent, within the previous six months.  The bridge was inspected in March 2007 during which no cracks were found.  The bridge is a major crossing for sugar beet trucks making their way to Drayton. The bridge was scheduled for replacement in 2009.

Major intersections

References

011
Transportation in Roseau County, Minnesota
Transportation in Lake of the Woods County, Minnesota
Transportation in Koochiching County, Minnesota
Transportation in Kittson County, Minnesota